John Henry Williams may refer to:

 John Henry Williams (baseball) (1968–2004), American businessperson
 John Henry Williams (economist) (1887–1980), American economist
 John Henry Williams (New Zealand politician) or Jack Williams (1918–1975), New Zealand Member of Parliament
 John Henry Williams (politician) (1869–1936), Welsh Member of Parliament
 John Henry Williams (soldier) or Jack Williams (1886–1953), Welsh soldier

See also 
 John Williams (disambiguation)
 John H. Williams (disambiguation)